Camille Duvall, also known as "The Golden Goddess", is a retired American female professional water skier. She is a five-time World Champion and Hall of Fame water skier. After her water skiing career, Camille worked for ESPN and Fox Sports as a broadcast journalist. Now she is a licensed real estate broker in New York, New York for Warburg Realty. She received a certificate in Broadcasting from New York University.

Career 
Duvall began water-skiing at the age of 4, and won her first tournament at the age of 6. She won a junior national competition at 12. In 1985, she held the waterskiing's triple crown, being the U.S. National Champion, World Slalom Champion, and Masters Champion. She won 14 national titles in the course of her career. In 1987, she became the first woman water skier to earn more than $100,000 in prizes and endorsements.

References

Living people
1960 births
American water skiers
New York University alumni
American television sports anchors